The men's 1000 metres race of the 2014–15 ISU Speed Skating World Cup 3, arranged in Sportforum Hohenschönhausen, in Berlin, Germany, was held on 6 December 2014.

Nico Ihle of Germany won, followed by Samuel Schwarz of Germany in second place, and Hein Otterspeer of the Netherlands in third place. Jonathan Garcia of the United States won Division B.

Results
The race took place on Saturday, 6 December, with Division B scheduled in the morning session, at 10:29, and Division A scheduled in the afternoon session, at 13:45.

Division A

Division B

References

Men 1000
3